George Joseph may refer to:

George W. Joseph (1872–1930), Oregon attorney
George Joseph (activist) (1887–1938), lawyer and Indian independence activist
George Joseph (banker), Indian banker
George Joseph (insurer) (born 1921), founder of Mercury Insurance Group of Los Angeles
George Joseph (scientist) (born 1938), pioneer of satellite based imaging sensors in India
George M. Joseph (1930–2003), chief judge of the Oregon Court of Appeals, 1981–1992
George Francis Joseph (1764–1846), English portrait painter
George Joseph (Australian politician), lord mayor of Adelaide, South Australia, 1977–1979
George Joseph (diplomat) (c. 1951–2017), Indian diplomat
George Joseph (composer) (born 1978), Indian music composer, programmer and music producer

See also